Beata Małecka-Libera (born 17 May 1954 in Dąbrowa Górnicza) is a Polish politician. She was elected to the Sejm on 25 September 2005, getting 6882 votes in 32 Sosnowiec district as a candidate from the Civic Platform list.

See also
Members of Polish Sejm 2005-2007
Politics of Poland

References

External links
Beata Małecka-Libera - parliamentary page - includes declarations of interest, voting record, and transcripts of speeches.
Beata Małecka-Libera - office page

Women members of the Sejm of the Republic of Poland
Women members of the Senate of Poland
Civic Platform politicians
1954 births
Living people
21st-century Polish women politicians
Members of the Polish Sejm 2005–2007
Members of the Polish Sejm 2007–2011
Members of the Polish Sejm 2011–2015
Members of the Polish Sejm 2015–2019
Members of the Senate of Poland 2019–2023